"Vamos a la playa" is a song by French Eurodance group Miranda, released in 1998 as the lead single from their debut studio album, Fiesta (1999). It peaked at number 7 on the Dutch Singles Chart, at number 4 on the Italian Singles Chart and at number 8 on the RPM Dance Chart in Canada. The vocals were performed by La Velle.

The Miranda version is famous as being used as the theme tune of the final round on Italian game show Passaparola. Dutch singer Loona covered the song in 2010.

Track listing and formats 

 French CD single

 "Vamos a la playa" (Ibiza Radio Edit) – 3:04
 "Vamos a la playa" (Ibiza Club Mix) – 5:08
 "Vamos a la playa" (Original Radio Edit) – 3:40

 French 12-inch single

A. "Vamos a la playa" (Ibiza Club Mix) – 5:08
B1. "Vamos a la playa" (London Club Remix) – 5:00
B2. "Vamos a la playa" (Ibiza Radio Edit) – 3:04

 German CD maxi-single

 "Vamos a la playa" (Video Edit) – 3:13
 "Vamos a la playa" (Ibiza Club Mix) – 5:08
 "Vamos a la playa" (London Club Mix) – 4:40
 "Vamos a la playa" (Mosso Bandidos Extended) – 5:25
 "Vamos a la playa" (Mosso Bandidos Edit) – 3:33
 "Vamos a la playa" (Subside Latino Remix) – 5:37
 "Vamos a la playa" (Subside Euro Remix) – 5:34

Charts

Weekly charts

Year-end charts

Release history

Loona version

The Dutch artist Loona covered the song and released it in 2010 as the second single from her album Summer Dance. It reached number 3 on the Belgian Singles Chart in Wallonia and peaked at number 4 on the French Singles Chart.

Charts

Weekly charts

Year-end charts

See also
2011 in European music
List of top 100 singles of 2011 (France)

References 

1998 songs
1998 singles
2010 singles
Loona (singer) songs
Songs written by Louis Element